Double Trouble may refer to:

Geography
 Double Trouble State Park, New Jersey

Film and TV

Film
 Double Trouble (1915 film), a silent film starring Douglas Fairbanks, Sr
 Double Trouble (1927 film), a silent film starring Snub Pollard
 Double Trouble (1941 film), a film featuring Richard Cramer
 Double Trouble (1951 film), a docu-drama directed by Lee Robinson
 Double Trouble (1967 film), a film starring Elvis Presley
 Double Trouble (1984 film), an Italian action comedy starring Terence Hill and Bud Spencer
 Double Trouble (1984 Hong Kong film), a film starring Eric Tsang
 Double Trouble (1992 film), a film starring the Barbarian Brothers, Peter and David Paul
 Double Trouble (2012 film), a Taiwanese action-comedy film starring Jaycee Chan

Television

Series 
 Double Trouble (Australian TV series), a 2008 children's series
 Double Trouble (U.S. TV series), a 1980s teen sitcom

Episodes 
 "Double Trouble" (The Adventures of Sinbad), 1996
 "Double Trouble" (Adventures of Superman), 1953
 "Double Trouble" (Archer), 2011
 "Double Trouble" (Code Lyoko), 2006
 "Double Trouble" (Dexter's Laboratory), 1996
 "Double Trouble" (Full House), 1991
 "Double Trouble" (H2O: Just Add Water), 2008
 "Double Trouble" (Hanazuki: Full of Treasures), 2017
 "Double Trouble" (He-Man and the Masters of the Universe), 1984
 "Double Trouble" (The Jeffersons), 1983
 "Double Trouble" (Keeping Up with the Kardashians), 2009
 "Double Trouble" (Lego Ninjago: Masters of Spinjitzu), 2012
 "Double Trouble" (Mr Bean: The Animated Series), 2004
 "Double Trouble" (Nash Bridges), 2000
 "Double Trouble" (The New Adventures of Zorro), 1981
 "Double Trouble" (One on One), 2006
 "Double Trouble" (Orange Is the New Black), 2018
 "Double Trouble" (The Partridge Family), 1973
 "Double Trouble" (Pawn Stars), 2010
 "Double Trouble" (Phil of the Future), 2005
 "Double Trouble" (Sailor Moon), 1995
 "Double Trouble" (Shaun the Sheep), 2009
 "Double Trouble" (Shimmer and Shine), 2016
 "Double Trouble" (The Six Million Dollar Man), 1976
 "Double Trouble" (Teen Titans Go!), 2013
 "Double Trouble" (Thomas and Friends), 1986
 "Double Trouble" (Three's Company), 1981
 "Double Trouble", an episode of Kidd Video, 1985
 "Double Trouble", an episode of The Mighty Hercules
 "Double Trouble", an episode of Shining Time Station, 1991
 "Double Trouble", an episode of The Loud House, 2022

Toys and games 
 Double Trouble (FIRST), a game for the 1999 FIRST Robotics competition
 Double Trouble (She-Ra), a character from the toyline She-Ra: Princess of Power and the She-Ra and the Princesses of Power animated series
 Viewtiful Joe: Double Trouble!, a 2005 video game for the Nintendo DS

People
 Doubble Troubble, an American juggling duo
 Double Trouble, lesser known name for professional wrestling tag-team Rhythm and Blues
 Double Trouble, a later name for The Undertakers a professional wrestling Jobber tag-team

Literature 
 Double Trouble (The Hardy Boys), a 2008 novel
 Double Trouble (manga), a 2002 Japanese manga by Takashi Kanzaki
 Double Trouble (book), a book by Muhammad Younis Butt
 Double Trouble, a Nintendo gamebook
 "Double Trouble", a comic strip in the 1987 British comic book Nipper
 Gerome McKenna, also known as Double Trouble, a fictional character in the DC Comics team Infinity, Inc.
 Double Trouble, a fictional character in the Marvel Comics group Weapon P.R.I.M.E.

Music

Performers and producers 
 Double Trouble (band), the backing band of blues guitarist Stevie Ray Vaughan and of guitarist James D. Lane
 Double Trouble (dance music producers), a UK dance group from the late 1980s and early 1990s
 Double Trouble (hip hop group), a hip hop duo consisting of Rodney Cee & KK Rockwell, which appear on the Wild Style Original Soundtrack
 Double Trouble, later Friends, a 1980s Dutch band featuring Carola Smit
 Double Trouble Productions, a studio operated by Michael Wagener

Albums 
 Double Trouble (soundtrack), the soundtrack by Elvis Presley from the 1967 film (see above)
 Double Trouble (Frankie Miller album)
 Double Trouble (George Jones and Johnny Paycheck album), 1980
 Double Trouble (Gillan album), 1981
 Double Trouble (Barry Guy and the London Jazz Composers' Orchestra album), 1990
 Double Trouble (P-Square album), 2014

Songs 
 "Double Trouble" (The Cars song), 1987
 "Double Trouble" (Jacky Cheung song), 2010
 "Double Trouble" (Lynyrd Skynyrd song), 1975
 "Double Trouble" (Otis Rush song), 1958
 "Double Trouble" (Will Ferrell and My Marianne song), song from the 2020 film Eurovision Song Contest: The Story of Fire Saga
 "Double Trouble", a song by Francesca & Mikaela
 "Double Trouble", a song by The Roots from Things Fall Apart
 "Double Trouble", a song from the Harry Potter and the Prisoner of Azkaban film soundtrack album
 "Double Trouble (Team Rocket)", a song from the Pokémon soundtrack album Pokémon 2.B.A. Master

See also 
 
 
 Deep Trouble (disambiguation)
 Triple Trouble (disambiguation)
 Trouble (disambiguation)